Guidances for statistics in regulatory affairs are applicable to the pharmaceutical industry and medical devices industry. These Guidances represent the current thinking of regulatory agencies on a particular subject. It is to be noted that the term “Guidances” is used in the USA, whereas the term “Guidelines” is used in Europe.

Regulatory affairs, also called government affairs, is a profession within regulated industries, such as pharmaceutical and medical devices, where professionals such as statisticians are expected to implement regulatory guidance into their work practices.

Statisticians working in a regulated environment (e.g. the pharmaceutical and healthcare industry) are obliged to have a sound knowledge and understanding of the regulatory requirements that affect the design, conduct, analysis and reporting of their studies.

Regulatory guidance for the pharmaceutical and medical devices industry can be found at the international level (e.g. ICH - International Council on Harmonisation of Technical Requirements for Registration of Pharmaceuticals for Human Use), as well as at the regional/national level; for example:
 EMA - European Medicines Agency in Europe, 
 MHRA - Medicines and Healthcare products Regulatory Agency in UK, 
 IQWiG - Institute for Quality and Efficiency in Health Care in Germany, 
 FDA - Food and Drug Administration in USA and 
 PMDA - Pharmaceuticals and Medical Devices Agency in Japan.

Furthermore, statistical regulatory guidance is found under general topics (e.g. Good Clinical Practice - ICH E6(R2)) and specific ones explicitly related to statistics (e.g. Statistical Principles for Clinical Trials - ICH E9 ) or not explicitly (e.g. Special Populations: Geriatrics [ICH E7]  or Clinical Trial Endpoints in Oncology [FDA]). This large volume and diversity of regulatory guidances (draft and/or final ) is subject to revisions. Therefore, users of the guidances are advised to consult the original website to check for the latest version. Users are also encouraged to update the Wikipedia content

The Wikipedia List of Guidances for Statistics in Regulatory Affairs provides links to various guidances under different topics.

History 
Regulation in the USA started in 1906 with the Food and Drugs Act and further USA regulation came in 1938 with the Federal Food, Drug, and Cosmetic Act following the deaths due to Elixir sulfanilamide in 1937. Further tragedies resulted from the use of Thalidomide that was marketed in 1957, Germany, without adequate testing. The Thalidomide catastrophe tightened the regulatory pressure in the US with the Kefauver Harris Amendment (1962) to the Federal Food, Drug, and Cosmetic Act  and the European regulation appeared with UK's "Medicines Act 1968". Further developments lead to a large volume and variety of regulatory “guidances” by the Food and Drug Administration (FDA) in the USA and “guidelines” by the European Medicines Agency (EMA) in Europe. Also, other regions of the world issued regulatory guidance, for example, Pharmaceuticals and Medical Devices Agency  (PMDA) in Japan. In 1989 a plan for harmonization of guidance across Europe, Japan and the USA was started and the first meeting of International Conference on Harmonisation of Technical Requirements for Registration of Pharmaceuticals for Human Use (ICH) was held in 1990, Brussels.

Regarding applications in Health technology assessment (HTA) a number of national guidance papers are available from the local  HTA organizations: the Institute for Quality and Efficiency in Health Care (IQWiG) in Germany, the National Institute for Health and Care Excellence (NICE) in UK, the Agency for Healthcare Research and Quality (AHRQ) in USA or the Canadian Agency for Drugs and Technologies in Health (CADTH) in Canada. In Europe, the European Network for Health Technology Assessment  (EUnetHTA) was established in 2005 to create an effective and sustainable network for HTA to support collaboration between European HTA organizations. EUnetHTA Guidelines have been developed to help the assessors of evidence to process, analyse and interpret the data.

General Guidance 
General guidance covers statistical topics that relate to good clinical practice; study design, monitoring and reporting, and market authorization of medical products or medical devices.

Good Clinical Practice  
The good clinical practice (GCP)  is an international ethical and scientific quality standard for designing, conducting, recording and reporting trials that involve the participation of human subjects. It was issued by ICH under Good Clinical Practice Directive (Directive 2005/28/EC) of 8 April 2005. A similar guideline for clinical trials of medical devices is the international standard ISO 14155, that is valid in the European Union as a harmonized standard.
Compliance with the GCP standard provides public assurance that the rights, safety and well-being of trial subjects are protected, consistent with the principles that have their origin in the Declaration of Helsinki, and that the clinical trial data are credible.

See also
 List of guidances for statistics in regulatory affairs
 Clinical trials
 Medical statistics
 Epidemiological method
 Epidemiology
 Medicine

References

External links  

 European Medicines Agency’s (EMA) scientific guidelines on biostatistics

Clinical trials
Biostatistics
Medical statistics